Cefn Bryn is an ancient ridge in Britain. It is a 5-mile-long Old Red Sandstone ridge in south Wales, in the heart of the Gower Peninsula, in the City and County of Swansea.  Local people colloquially refer to it as the "backbone of Gower", as it protrudes from surrounding limestone. The highest point on the ridge (188m/617 ft ) is the second highest point in the peninsula, offering panoramic views of the surrounding country and seas.  The swathes of grassland around the ridge are known as Cefn Bryn Common.

Along the ridge of the hill, banked by grassy common on both sides is the road from Cilibion to Reynoldston.  The road was previously known as the Old Coal Road and Red Road.  Wandering sheep, wild ponies and cows can be seen along the road.  Large swells and dips can be encountered along the route, formed by swallets and sinkholes in the surrounding limestone.  The highest point of the road intersects with the ridge summit.

Arthur's Stone

Just north of the ridge summit of Cefn Bryn, there is a neolithic burial ground, known as "Arthur's Stone". Its name comes from a legend that the ancient British King Arthur threw a large stone from Llanelli which landed on this spot. Another legend suggests that this is his burial site after being killed by Llanelli pagans during a campaign.

It is believed that during the Bronze Age Cefn Bryn was used extensively for ceremonies and rituals.  Beneath the bracken on the hill over sixty cairns have been discovered.  Most of these are likely to be no  more than collections of stones cleared by local farmers; but just north-west of Arthur's Stone three prominent cairns have been excavated that prove their ancient role - the largest being Great Cairn, a circular heap of stones above a central grave.

Broad Pool

There is a small fresh water pool called Broad Pool at the foot of the eastern approach to the ridge.  This pool is known to have existed since 1645, and has dried out and been re-excavated twice.  Today it is a protected nature reserve.  It lies in a shallow basin on the limestone plateau beneath Cefn Bryn, and consists of an acidic pond, heath and bog, which is important for aquatic plants, amphibians, dragonflies (including Southern Damselfly) and wetland birds.

In art
A landscape painting of Cefn Bryn from Pennard castle by the Neo-impressionist painter Lucien Pissarro may be seen in the Glynn Vivian Art Gallery, Swansea.

References

External links
Explore Gower: Cefn Bryn
The Gower Information Center: Broad Pool
Local Features West: Gower Walks
Broad Pool and Bog
Geological Society - Cefn Bryn

4th-millennium BC architecture
Archaeological sites in Swansea
Bronze Age Wales
Buildings and structures in Swansea
Geology of Wales
Megalithic monuments in Wales
Prehistoric sites in Swansea
Gower Peninsula
Mountains and hills of Swansea
Sites of Special Scientific Interest in West Glamorgan
Stone Age Britain
Stone Age sites in Wales
Ridges of Wales
Monuments and memorials in Swansea